Nogal de las Huertas is a municipality located in the province of Palencia, Castile and León, Spain. 
According to the 2004 census (INE), the municipality has a population of 62 inhabitants.

It is the site of the monastery of San Salvador, founded in 1063.

References

Municipalities in the Province of Palencia